The 2020 Cupa României Final is the final match of the 2019–20 Cupa României and the 82nd final of the Cupa României, Romania's premier football cup competition. It was played on 22 July 2020 between Sepsi Sfântu Gheorghe and FCSB.

Sepsi  reached their first cup final in the club's existence. The club from Sfântu Gheorghe was founded in 2011, this being the biggest achievement in their 9 years of club history. On the other hand, FCSB were playing their 32nd Cupa României final, having won the trophy 22 times.

The winner qualified for the 2020–21 UEFA Europa League. They also earned the right to play against 2019–20 Liga I champions for the 2020 Supercupa României.

FCSB won the game thanks to a goal scored by Dennis Man in the 65th minute.

The game was hosted by the Ilie Oană Stadium in Ploiești. Due to the COVID-19 pandemic, the game was played behind closed doors.

Route to the Final

Match

Notes

References

External links
 Official site 

2020
2019–20 in Romanian football
2019–20 Cupa României
July 2020 sports events in Romania